Gaëlle Buniet (born 21 January 1978) is a French rower. She competed at the 2000 Summer Olympics and the 2004 Summer Olympics.

References

1978 births
Living people
French female rowers
Olympic rowers of France
Rowers at the 2000 Summer Olympics
Rowers at the 2004 Summer Olympics
People from Grande-Synthe
Sportspeople from Nord (French department)
20th-century French women
21st-century French women